Malé Kršteňany is a village and municipality in Partizánske District in the Trenčín Region of western Slovakia.

History
In historical records the village was first mentioned in 1271.

Geography
The municipality lies at an altitude of 230 metres and covers an area of 6.292 km2. It has a population of about 532 people.

References

External links

  Official page
https://web.archive.org/web/20070513023228/http://www.statistics.sk/mosmis/eng/run.html

Villages and municipalities in Partizánske District